xxxHolic (stylized as ×××HOLiC; pronounced "Holic") is a Japanese manga series written and illustrated by the manga group Clamp. The series, which crosses over with another Clamp work, Tsubasa: Reservoir Chronicle, revolves around Kimihiro Watanuki, a high school student who is disturbed by his ability to see the supernatural, and Yūko Ichihara, a powerful witch who owns a wish-granting shop. When Watanuki asks Ichihara to remove his ability to see spirits, she grants it on the condition that he pay for his wish by working for her. Clamp created xxxHolic to link the supernatural and fantasy series.

xxxHolic was serialized in Kodansha's seinen manga magazine Weekly Young Magazine periodically from February 2003 until March 2010. It then moved to the shōnen manga magazine Bessatsu Shōnen Magazine in June 2010, where it ended serialization in February 2011; its chapters were collected in 19 tankōbon volumes. A sequel, xxxHolic: Rei, started in 2013. It was first published in the United States by Del Rey Manga and in the United Kingdom by Tanoshimi in 2004, then was later published in a series of omnibuses by Kodansha Comics as of 2014. In 2005, Production I.G adapted the manga into an animated film, which was followed by two anime television series, and various original video animations (OVAs). Funimation licensed the film and the first TV series in North America, and released both of them in DVD as well as Blu-ray Disc. A light novel and a video game have also been released based on the series.

The manga has been well received by both Japanese and English readers and has appeared in various rankings of bestselling books. Critics have generally praised the series for its illustrations and its portrayal of supernatural elements.

Plot

Kimihiro Watanuki is a high school student plagued by ayakashi spirits which are invisible to everyone else but him. The series begins when Watanuki stumbles, seemingly by chance, into a shop that grants wishes. The shop is owned by Yūko Ichihara, a mysterious witch of many names and esoteric renown. For a price, she offers to grant Watanuki's wish to be rid of the spirits. The price, according to Yūko, must be of equal value; so, as payment, he must become Yūko's temporary, part-time cook and housekeeper. While his established job consists of household chores, Yūko increasingly sends him on errands of a supernatural or spiritual nature as the series develops. Himawari Kunogi, Watanuki's love interest, and Shizuka Dōmeki, a classmate whom Watanuki initially detests, occasionally join him in his work as per Yūko's request. The three become increasingly close, and though Watanuki is often annoyed with Dōmeki, he grows to value the new friendships he makes and his life at the wish shop. At the same time, though, he begins to worry about Yūko, wondering if she who grants wishes to others ever has anything to wish for herself. Eventually, he makes a promise to try and grant her a wish, should she have one.

With each supernatural encounter, Watanuki becomes more familiar with and connected to the spiritual world. A crossing plotline with the concurrent series Tsubasa: Reservoir Chronicle reveals that Yūko is actually on the verge of death, and she is only alive now because her personal time was accidentally frozen long ago by the powerful wizard Clow Reed. As the magic binding her in time begins to dissolve, Yūko's ability to maintain the shop's magical existence fades, and she eventually passes on, telling Watanuki that he will finally be free of his ability to see demons. However, Watanuki chooses to retain his ability to see spirits in order to maintain Yūko's shop and take over her role of shopkeeper. Further cross-over plotlines reveal that Watanuki was born as a result of a wish to turn back time by a shop client, Syaoran of Tsubasa. Since Syaoran was able to go back in time (at the cost of being removed from his timeline and becoming imprisoned by the sorcerer Fei-Wang Reed), Watanuki was born to replace the void in timespace Syaoran left behind, and thus while they are different people, they share an "existence". As the series reaches its conclusion, Syaoran and Watanuki become trapped in a void by Fei-Wang and must pay a price to become free and continue existing. While Syaoran decides to keep traveling through dimensions, never stopping in a single place, Watanuki chooses to stay inside the shop and act as its owner, granting wishes until the day he sees Yūko again. As time progresses, Watanuki continues working in the shop without aging. Dōmeki, his assistant, frequently visits him, and the tradition continues with Dōmeki's descendants. After 100 years pass, Watanuki has a dream of Yūko, who tells him that he has finally become powerful enough to leave the shop. Despite this, he decides to continue waiting inside the shop for the day that they meet again.

Background

xxxHolic was conceived when the group Clamp wanted to link the supernatural and fantasy series they made with a realistic one. This idea was further worked with the creation of the character of Yūko Ichihara who would bridge the stories from xxxHolic and Tsubasa: Reservoir Chronicle. Clamp proposed the idea of writing xxxHolic to Young Magazine after Chobits. In the end they decided to publish both xxxHolic and Tsubasa in weekly magazines to make serialization easier. The manga's title was originally going to be "addicted" but it was changed for the less ambiguous "holic." Like Clamp's previous work Tokyo Babylon, xxxHolic focuses on social pathologies but with a more esoteric tone.
The "xxx" before the holic is the Japanese way of saying of "fill in the blank." Therefore, the title itself gives a hint about what the series are about. It is talking about the people with the problems such as an alcoholic, or a workaholic. Being a fantastical series, these "---holics " can have very different pathologies.

The art style of the manga draws on the influence of ukiyo-e wood prints. When making a chapter composed of about twenty pages, Clamp takes around two days to make the artwork, the time differing with the ones from other series they made. The script of the series made by Nanase Ohkawa, who the other Clamp members ask her about any confusion they have before starting drawing the chapters. The illustrations and character designs are mainly done by Tsubaki Nekoi with assistance from Mokona, although Satsuki Igarashi also draws various parts. For the series, they decided to use Japanese and Chinese themes, but avoided using tones. Mokona is mainly in charge of designing the female characters, while Nekoi draws the male ones and all the spirits featured. The artwork is also inspired by Alphonse Mucha who Mokona is a fan of. This leads to all the tankobon covers being gold or silver and then color printed over it. The series was retitled xxxHolic Rō ever since volume 16 because of how Watanuki replaced Yuko as the shop's owner.

When first presenting the idea of running xxxHolic linked with Tsubasa: Reservoir Chronicle, although Ohkawa expressed concerns for the strain the weekly pace of such a series would place on the artists, she whole-heartedly approved. In accordance with Ohkawa's desire for each to have a well-organized story, Clamp avoids putting references between the two stories too frequently. The reasons for linking these two series was because Clamp wanted to have two protagonists from two different manga with different personalities and design, yet during the ending they would be stated to be same person, and had to go on different paths. Because Tsubasa: Reservoir Chronicle was more focused on action scenes, Clamp sometimes took breaks from xxxHolic or create autoconclusive stories so that the storyline between the two series would always be linked. In April 2010, Clamp stated that the xxxHolic was taking longer than what they expected, causing delays to some of their other works. When the manga finished serialization, Clamp felt it was more the ending from xxxHolic Rō, pointing that xxxHolic had already ended. Regarding the series' finale, Clamp wanted to express that while Watanuki's decision to stay in the shop may seem sad for readers, for Watanuki it was his happiness. Clamp was satisfied with people's reaction to the last chapter, as when discussing Watanuki's fate, they were also thinking what is happiness for them.

Themes
As the title implies, the manga focuses on addictions to regular habits. These addictions are expanded in a supernatural setting serving as a parallel to real world societies. Watanuki's problem of being constantly followed by demons can be compared with the sensation of a normal person feeling scared by the belief he is observed. Across the series, several clients with different addictions visits Yuko's shop seeking help. Solving these cases results in moral dilemmas. Clamp places emphasis on the importance of words when writing the manga. Yuko's dialogues always affect the other characters due to how direct and secure she is when speaking. In early chapters, while she worries a woman addicted to the internet by labeling her husband and child as "other people," Yuko is transmitting the philosophy of individualism and the power her client has. In contrast to Yuko, another client has a tendency to lie which brings her misfortunes.

Media

Manga

Written and illustrated by Clamp, xxxHolic started in Kodansha's seinen manga magazine Weekly Young Magazine on February 24, 2003. The series finished its publication in the magazine on March 20, 2010, and was transferred to Kodansha's shōnen manga magazine Bessatsu Shōnen Magazine on May 8 of the same year; a special 26-page one-shot chapter was also published in Weekly Shōnen Magazine on May 19 of the same year. The series finished on February 9, 2011. Kodansha collected its 213 chapters in 19 tankōbon volumes; the numbers of chapters for such release was reduced by combining the ones from the original serialization. Starting volume 16, the series is retitled , but the number of chapters follow the previous ones. The first volume was released on July 25, 2003, and the last one on March 9, 2011.

xxxHolic was one of the first four manga series licensed for English release in North America by Del Rey Manga, and was acquired together with Mobile Suit Gundam SEED, Negima!: Magister Negi Magi, and Tsubasa: Reservoir Chronicle in January 2004. Del Rey published its first volume on April 27, 2004, and on February 21, 2012, the nineteenth and final volume was released. Kodansha USA re-released it in 3-in-1 omnibus format in 2014. The series has also been licensed for an English-language release by Tanoshimi, who released the first nine volumes in the United Kingdom with the first one on August 3, 2006.

A second xxxHolic manga series, titled  was announced at The CLAMP Festival 2012 event. It was scheduled to be published in Weekly Young Magazine in February 2013, however a month's delay in the magazine's issue release dates changed this to March 4, 2013. The series has had various hiatuses; its latest chapters were published from June 2016 to March 2017. In April 2022, it was announced that Clamp was planning to resume the series in 2023. Kodansha released the first tankōbon volume on October 23, 2013. As of October 6, 2016, four volumes have been released.

Kodansha USA announced in July 2013 they licensed the manga for English release, releasing the first volume in 2014.

Film

Production I.G produced an animated film of the series titled xxxHolic: A Midsummer Night's Dream (×××HOLiC: 真夏ノ夜ノ夢 - xxxHOLiC: Manatsu no Yoru no Yume) which premiered on August 20, 2005 alongside Tsubasa Reservoir Chronicle the Movie: The Princess in the Birdcage Kingdom. The DVD version was released on November 24, 2006. In the film, Yūko receives a request from a woman to help her back into her mansion, which does not allow her to enter. Yūko says that since Watanuki was the one who brought the client to her, he should be the one to grant her wish and therefore is brought along with her and Dōmeki. Yūko also attends because she has been invited to the mansion with many other famous collectors by the same letter, with the mansion filled with strange rooms and mysterious letters telling its guests what to do in place of a host.

The film was selected as a finalist for the Annecy International Animated Film Festival 2006 in the Feature Films category with other four nominees: Asterix and the Vikings, Origin: Spirits of the Past, Wallace & Gromit: The Curse of the Were-Rabbit, and the award winner, Renaissance.

Anime television series

The anime adaptations of xxxHolic were produced by Production I.G. The first season of anime television adaptation of xxxHolic began airing on Tokyo Broadcasting System Television on April 6, 2006 in Japan and ended on September 28, 2006, with 24 episodes in total. Both the film and the anime series are directed by Tsutomu Mizushima. Ageha Ohkawa, Clamp's director and main scriptwriter, served as executive producer and co-served as the series composition writer of the TV series. The second season, began airing on TBS on April 3, 2008 in Japan and ended on June 26, 2008, with 13 episodes in total. The main staff and cast remains the same as in the first season. The first season's episodes were also collected in eight DVD volumes published between July 26, 2007 and February 21, 2008, while two DVD boxes were released on August 25, 2010 and October 27, 2010. The second's ones were released in seven DVD volumes between June 25, 2008 and December 17, 2008, a DVD box was released on January 26, 2011.

The first season is licensed by Funimation (now known as Crunchyroll) in July 2007. Six DVDs were released between March 25, 2008 and October 21, 2008 featuring the first season while a DVD box was released on July 28, 2009. On January 26, 2009, the series made its North American debut on the Funimation Channel. As of October 2022, the series migrated to the Crunchyroll streaming service from the FunimationNOW video streaming app.

Original video animations
A two-DVD original video animation, entitled  was also released by Production I.G. The first DVD for this OVA was released on February 17, 2009 with the 14th volume of the Japanese manga. The second one was released alongside volume 15 on June 26, 2009. Its story focuses on how Haruka Domeki tells Watanuki and Domeki to search for four items, which lead Watanuki to enter into the Dream World. The OVA was rereleased in Blu-ray format alongside the first volume of xxxHolic Rei on October 23, 2013.

Another OVA titled  was shipped with the 17th volume of the xxxHolic manga on April 23, 2010. It is set ever since Yūko's death, and follows Watanuki's life as the new shop's owner. Another OVA titled  was released on March 9, 2011 as included with a special edition from volume 19. In the OVA, Watanuki sees various parts of Domeki's life, including his childhood and the events that happened across the series.

Live-action TV series

It was announced on September 7, 2012, that xxxHolic will be adapted into a live action TV series for airing at February 24, 2013 on WOWOW, titled . Anne Watanabe plays the role of Yuko Ichihara, while Shota Sometani plays the character Kimihiro Watanuki. The series is directed by Keisuke Toyoshima. It ran for eight episodes. It features "Aitai" from Suga Shikao as its opening theme song. The series was collected in a box released in both DVD and Blu-ray format on November 6, 2013.

Live-action film

On November 22, 2021, Shochiku and Asmik Ace announced that a live-action film adaptation was in the works for xxxHolic, with Ko Shibasaki and Ryūnosuke Kamiki playing Yuko Ichihara and Kimihiro Watanuki respectively. Mika Ninagawa directed the film, while Erika Yoshida provided the screenplay. The film was released in Japanese theaters on April 29, 2022.

Other
There were also several other releases in the franchise. A novel titled , was written by Nisio Isin and published in Japan on August 1, 2006. It features four stories with the first one being an adaptation of the series' first chapter. The novel includes original artwork by Clamp. Del Rey published an English translation of xxxHOLiC: AnotherHOLiC, released on October 28, 2008.

Several fanbooks have been released in Japan. TV Animation ×××HOLiC Extra Official Guide was released on May 17, 2006, and focused in information from the anime adaptation. It was released in English by Del Rey on October 27, 2009 as "The Official xxxHOLiC Guide". On March 17, 2011, Kodansha published another guidebook titled . It is set prior to the events of xxxHolic and Tsubasa and tells the lives from the two Mokona Modoki ever since their creation by Clow Reed and Yūko Ichihara. In January 2013 Kodansha will also release a xxxHolic artbook.

An adventure game by Marvelous Entertainment for the PlayStation 2 video game console was released in Japan on August 9, 2007, named .

Two soundtrack albums were released for the franchise. The first one is xxxHolic: A Midsummer Night's Dream Original Soundtrack which was released on August 18, 2005 by Pony Canyon. It contains over twenty tracks from the series' film. The second soundtrack, titled xxxHolic Sound File, was released August 22, 2008 by S.E.N.S. PROJECT. The CD includes thirty-five soundtracks (including a hidden bonus track), various of them from the PlayStation 2 game as well as from the TV series. xxxHolic also makes a crossover with Tsubasa in the drama CDs series  which was released in three volumes.

An all-male stage play of xxxHolic (also known as ) began showing on September 17, 2021 in Tokyo. The play is directed by Fumiya Matsuzaki, written by Masafumi Hata, planned by Nanase Ohkawa, and produced by Nelke Planning. The play stars Motohiro Ota and Shōgo Sakamoto as Yūko Ichihara and Kimihiro Watanuki respectively.

Reception

Sales
The series has sold well in Japan with its thirteenth volume being 43rd in the top 50 manga sold in Japan in 2008. In May 2015, Kodansha announced the manga has 13.7 million copies in print. The series' debut in North America was also successful with its first volume ranking sixth in Nielsen Bookscan's list of bestselling volumes during its first week. Volume 13 also hit No. 6 on the New York Times list of bestselling manga shortly after its launch in April 2009. According to the New York Times, xxxHolic was the sixth best-selling manga in the United States in 2009. In Mania Entertainment's "Best Manga Awards For 2005", xxxHolic was the winner in the category "Best Mature".

Manga
The xxxHolic manga series has also been well received by various publications with Mania Entertainment's Megan Lavey praising its focus on the people's thoughts, as well as its comedy. She also found its connection with Tsubasa: Reservoir Chronicle appealing due to events being depicted from different points of view, persuading readers to read both series. Michael Aronson from Manga Life stated the series' introduction had potential to be worth reading due to its episodic nature and found some of its characters to be "gripping", though Dan Polley, also from Manga Life, commenting that Watanuki "does seem a little bit weak to be the lead character". On the other hand, Matthew Alexander from Mania Entertainment stated that Watanuki's character was well developed across the series, becoming more appealing. Joy Kim, another writer from Manga Life, praised how despite its episodic nature, the narrative brought by Watanuki's interactions with other characters made every panel "loaded with significance". Carlo Santos of Anime News Network liked how later volumes of the series "[outdid] itself by breaking into the world of dreams", compared to initial volumes that focused on the interaction between humans and spirit. Active Anime found its emotional tension as well as its connection with Tsubasa some of the main reason why the series is worth reading. Not having read Tsubasa, Matthew Alexander felt that the addition of elements from the series into xxxHolic was well-made, as it started to suggest a connection between the two series' protagonists. However, Santos found the series' connection with Tsubasa to be confusing to the point that only readers from both series would understand some explanations.

Regarding events happening from volume 15 onwards, Active Anime's Holly Ellingwood called them "tragic, inspiring, and beautifully, breathtakingly sad", enjoying the way Yuko's fate was revealed, but wondering how it would continue. Carlo Santos stated that although the series lost its "star performer", it kept being appealing due to the fact that Watanuki replaced her and found most of volume 16 as "an exercise in getting back on one's feet after a heartbreaking loss, and it is all the more inspirational for that." Matthew Alexander from Mania was more critical to these events due to the how it became "an ultra serious downer" due to Yuko's loss and the lack of its recurring comedy. Additionally, he cited the events regarding Yuko's disappearance and later death were not explained in xxxHolic, stating that only readers from Tsubasa would understand such events. The artwork has been praised because of its "striking designs and patterns built into the images", various notable traits from Clamp, as well as for being "equally memorable and evocative". On the other hand, it has also been criticized for being "less visually busy than Tsubasa" due to some pages lacking backgrounds, though critic Michael Aronson for Manga Life stated that the panels' composition is able to make up for such issues. Rebecca Silverman review the opening volume of xxxHolic: Rei gave the sequel a B+ rating, praising the way the story now flowed and the artwork, but said that the story was, "a little too mysterious in places".

Anime
The anime adaptation of xxxHolic has received mixed reception from different publications, with Anime News Network's Casey Brienza liking how its first season is faithful to the original material. However, she found that some of Funimation's subtitles in its first episodes to be confusing, advising people to watch the English dubbed version instead. In a bigger overview of the first season, Carlo Santos found issues with the animation's unintentional "super deformed" moments in which the characters' limbs became notably longer. He also criticized some of its episodes' storytelling as it "falls flat" due to trivial issues discussed. Holly Ellingwood from Active Anime called the series "one of the most distinctly imaginative" because of the combination of supernatural elements and comedy. Pointing to the animation quality, Ellingwood found each character distinctive and the animation issues to be comical. DVD Talk's Todd Douglass Jr. gave praise to the themes touched upon in the anime series. Despite giving disapproval to its episodic nature, Douglass found the characters appealing due to their development over the series. IGN writer Jeff Harris found its start "tolerable", stating that fans from action series may not be interested by xxxHolic despite its potential. Like Santos, he commented on its animation, citing similar issues with the design, noting some moments lacked the fluidity seen in other parts of the series. He also criticized the blank background choices, questioning if they were truly artistic decisions or done to save on animation costs. Chris Beveridge of Mania gave a mixed review for the animation, agreeing with Santos and Harris, but still enjoyed the animation style, concluding that "everything about the visual design of the show is very appealing." Analyzing its episodic nature, Beveridge enjoyed the format, and praised the series' ability to strike a balance between light and dark parts of its stories.

Notes

References

External links

 xxxHolic: A Midsummer Night's Dream and xxxHolic TV series at Production I.G's Official site
 xxxHolic ~Watanuki no Izayoi Sowa~ official game site 
 

XxxHolic
2003 manga
2006 anime television series debuts
2006 Japanese novels
2008 anime television series debuts
2009 anime OVAs
2010 anime OVAs
2011 anime OVAs
Anime series
Crossover anime and manga
Dark fantasy anime and manga
Del Rey Manga
Funimation
Kodansha manga
Production I.G
Seinen manga
Shōnen manga
Witchcraft in anime and manga
Works by Clamp (manga artists)
Yōkai in anime and manga
Nisio Isin
Wowow original programming